Olga Vladimirovna Buyanova (born March 27, 1954 in Irkutsk, RSFSR) is an Honored Master of Sports coach in Rhythmic gymnastics of the USSR and Russia.

Personal life 
Olga Vladimirovna is married to Anatoly Buyanov, the director of the Youth Sports School of rhythmic gymnastics in Irkutsk. They have two sons.

Coaching career 
Buyanova was the head coach of the Italian national team in rhythmic gymnastics for six years until her departure and return to Irkutsk. She coaches at the sports school for rhythmic gymnastics in Dinamo Irkutsk. In 2013, Buyanova also began coaching at the newly opened Baikal-Arena.

notable trainees 
 Daria Dmitrieva - 2012 Olympic silver medalist
 Oxana Kostina - 1992 World All-around champion and 1992 European All-around bronze medalist
 Natalia Lipkovskaya - 1997 World All-around silver medalist

References

External links
 Olga Buyanova
 Rhythmic Gymnastics Results

1954 births
Living people
Sportspeople from Irkutsk
Russian gymnastics coaches
Honoured Masters of Sport of the USSR
Honoured Coaches of Russia